Christopher Austin Lynn (born 10 April 1990) is an Australian cricketer. He is a right-handed batsman who plays for Queensland in Australian domestic cricket. Lynn was born in Brisbane, Queensland, and attended St Joseph's Nudgee College and the Queensland Academy of Sport. He is known for being an explosive batsman capable of hitting big sixes.

Early career
When not on professional duties, Lynn plays senior cricket for Toombul District Cricket Club in Brisbane.

Lynn played for the Queensland under-19 side and made his first-class debut as a 19-year-old against South Australia at the Gabba in March 2010. A week later, against Western Australia, he scored 139 runs in the second innings and effectively saved Queensland from defeat. He represented the Brisbane Heat in the Big Bash League between 2011 and 2022. In his first season, he made 109 at an average of 21.80, in his second he made 175 at 35.00, including 51 off 29 balls against the Perth Scorchers and in his third he scored 198 runs at 28.28 with his best innings again coming against the Scorchers; this time he made 81.

Domestic, T20 career

India
He was a part of the Deccan Chargers team during the 2011 and 2012 Indian Premier League (IPL) tournaments but only got to play one match for the team in IPL 2012. For the 2014, season he was signed by the Kolkata Knight Riders and in his first match he was the man of the match, scoring 45 off 31 balls and taking a brilliant catch near the boundary to dismiss AB de Villiers that turned the game in the final over. In IPL 2015, he was retained by the Kolkata Knight Riders but he got injured and was ruled out of the tournament. Johan Botha came in as a replacement. He hit a career best 19-ball 50 as opener of Kolkata Knight Riders vs Gujarat Lions in IPL 2017 in which he hit 8 sixes . In the following match against the Mumbai Indians, he injured his shoulder while attempting to take a tough catch of Jos Buttler. He returned 1 month later and smashed a 22 ball 50 in his comeback match against Royal Challengers Bangalore, where he and Sunil Narine (54 off 17) smashed 105 runs in the first 6 overs. It is the most runs scored by a team in the Powerplay in IPL history. He continued his good form by scoring 84 in the next match, although unfortunately in a losing cause. He finished the season with a staggering strike rate of over 180, and despite missing most of the season, was one of the most important players for the Kolkata Knight Riders. He was released by the Kolkata Knight Riders ahead of the 2020 IPL auction. In the 2020 IPL auction, he was bought by the Mumbai Indians ahead of the 2020 Indian Premier League.

Australia
On 9 February 2015, he scored an unbeaten 250 against Victoria, in the Sheffield Shield. On 29 December 2015, scored his first T20 century. Playing for Brisbane Heat in the Big Bash League hit 101 off 51 deliveries against the Hobart Hurricanes. He ended the season as the competition's leading run scorer, scoring three half centuries on top of his century, ending the tournament with 378 runs at an average of 54.00. He was named the player of the tournament.

Lynn's form continued in the next edition of the Big Bash League, ending the season as the player of the tournament despite playing just five matches. He scored an unbeaten 85 against Sydney Thunder on 28 December 2016, an unbeaten 84 against Hobart Hurricanes two days later and 98 not out against the Perth Scorchers on 5 January 2017, an innings which contained 11 sixes. Once again, Lynn was named player of the tournament, scoring 309 runs at an average of 154.50.

In the following season, Lynn was restricted by injury, playing just the five matches and scoring 148 runs at 37.00.

Lynn was fit enough to play the entire season of the 2018-19 Big Bash League, ending the season as the Heat's leading run scorer with 385 runs at an average of 35.00.

In the  2021-22 Big Bash League season, Lynn scored 215 runs at an average of 17.91, which followed in his axing from the club.

North America
In the 2018 Caribbean Premier League player draft he was bought by Trinbago Knight Riders. In May 2018, he was named as one of the ten marquee players for the first edition of the Global T20 Canada cricket tournament. On 3 June 2018, he was selected to play for the Edmonton Royals in the players' draft for the inaugural edition of the tournament. In June 2019, he was selected to play for the Winnipeg Hawks franchise team in the 2019 Global T20 Canada tournament.

In July 2020, he was named in the St Kitts & Nevis Patriots squad for the 2020 Caribbean Premier League.

Europe
In July 2019, he was selected to play for the Edinburgh Rocks in the inaugural edition of the Euro T20 Slam cricket tournament. However, the following month the tournament was cancelled.

Pakistan
At 2018 PSL players draft, he was picked by Lahore Qalandars as their platinum pick. However, shoulder injury made him unavailable for the entire season. He was replaced by South Africa's Kyle Abbott.

In December 2019, he was again drafted by Lahore Qalandars as their Platinum Category round pick at the 2020 PSL draft for the fifth season, played entirely in Pakistan for the first time. He was team's leading and overall the second highest runs-getter of the season, with 284 runs in 8 innings, including a knock of 113 not out (his best T20 score, until date) during team's last group stage match against Multan Sultans, which helped Qalandars to qualify for the play-offs for the first time in their history.

International career

Lynn made his Twenty20 international debut against England in Hobart on 29 January 2014. He made 33 off 19 balls, including three sixes, but did not get to bat in his second game.

In January 2017, he was named in Australia One Day International (ODI) squad for their series against Pakistan. He made his ODI debut for Australia against Pakistan on 13 January 2017.

Playing style
Chris Lynn is a hard hitting batsman who is known for his extraordinary hitting and explosive power. He is able to consistently hit sixes over 90 metres. During a game in the Big Bash League, playing for the Brisbane Heat, Lynn hit a ball from former Australian fast bowler Shaun Tait onto the roof of The Gabba. Lynn set a new record with his explosive knock hitting 91 runs from 30 balls playing for Maratha Arabians against Abu Dhabi in T10 league.

References

External links

Chris Lynn at Brisbane Heat
Chris Lynn at Queensland Cricket

1990 births
Australia One Day International cricketers
Australia Twenty20 International cricketers
Australian cricketers
Brisbane Heat cricketers
Cricketers from Brisbane
Deccan Chargers cricketers
Guyana Amazon Warriors cricketers
Jamaica Tallawahs cricketers
Kandurata Warriors cricketers
Khulna Tigers cricketers
Kolkata Knight Riders cricketers
Lahore Qalandars cricketers
Living people
Multan Sultans cricketers
Mumbai Indians cricketers
Northern Superchargers cricketers
People educated at St Joseph's College, Nudgee
Queensland cricketers
St Kitts and Nevis Patriots cricketers
Sunrisers Hyderabad cricketers
Trinbago Knight Riders cricketers